David Carswell Philip (1880 – 29 April 1917) was a Scottish professional footballer who played as a half back in the Scottish League for Heart of Midlothian, Raith Rovers and Leith Athletic.

Personal life 
Philip served as an enlisted man in the Royal Scots during the First World War. He was commissioned as a second lieutenant into the Royal Northumberland Fusiliers on 2 April 1917 and was killed less than a month later on the Western Front. Philip is commemorated on the Arras Memorial.

Career statistics

Honours 
Heart of Midlothian

 Scottish Cup (1): 1905–06
 East of Scotland Shield (3): 1903–04, 1905–06, 1906–07
 East of Scotland Cup (1): 1905–06
 East of Scotland Cup & Wilson Cup (1): 1906–07

References 

Scottish footballers
1917 deaths
British Army personnel of World War I
British military personnel killed in World War I
1880 births
Royal Scots soldiers
Scottish Football League players
Heart of Midlothian F.C. players
Footballers from Dundee
Association football wing halves
Leith Athletic F.C. players
Raith Rovers F.C. players
Royal Northumberland Fusiliers officers